The 2000 Players Championship was a golf tournament in Florida on the PGA Tour, held  at TPC Sawgrass in Ponte Vedra Beach, southeast of Jacksonville. It was the 27th Players Championship. 

Hal Sutton, the champion seventeen years earlier in 1983, led by a stroke after each round and won his second Players, a stroke ahead of runner-up Tiger Woods. Both carded scores of 71 (−1) in the final round, and Sutton hit 17 of 18 greens in regulation. Because of thunderstorms and heavy rain, the final round was completed on Monday, March 27. In the last pairing, Sutton and Woods were on the twelfth hole when play was suspended on Sunday night.

Late in the third round on Saturday, Sutton had gone 25 holes without making a bogey. At the par-3 17th hole, he hit his tee shot in the water and took a triple-bogey six, which trimmed his lead over Woods to just one stroke.

Traditionally the richest event in golf, this was the first Players with a seven-figure winner's share, at $1.08 million. Sutton's win in 1983 was the first Players with a six-figure first prize. Woods won the event the following year.

Defending champion David Duval finished nine strokes back, in a tie for thirteenth place.

Venue

Field
Fulton Allem, Robert Allenby, Stephen Ames, Billy Andrade, Stuart Appleby, Tommy Armour III, Woody Austin, Paul Azinger, Craig Barlow, Doug Barron, Rich Beem, Notah Begay III, Thomas Bjørn, Ronnie Black, Jay Don Blake, Eric Booker, Mike Brisky, Mark Brooks, Olin Browne, Tom Byrum, Mark Calcavecchia, Jim Carter, Greg Chalmers, Brandel Chamblee, Barry Cheesman, Stewart Cink, Darren Clarke, Russ Cochran, John Cook, Fred Couples, Ben Crenshaw, John Daly, Robert Damron, Glen Day, Jay Delsing, Chris DiMarco, Trevor Dodds, Scott Dunlap, David Duval, Ernie Els, Bob Estes, Brad Fabel, Nick Faldo, Brad Faxon, Steve Flesch, Dan Forsman, Carlos Franco, Harrison Frazar, David Frost, Fred Funk, Jim Furyk, Sergio García, Brent Geiberger, Bill Glasson, Matt Gogel, Retief Goosen, Paul Goydos, Wayne Grady, Scott Gump, Jay Haas, Dudley Hart, J. P. Hayes, Nolan Henke, Brian Henninger, Tim Herron, Gabriel Hjertstedt, Scott Hoch, Bradley Hughes, John Huston, Lee Janzen, Miguel Ángel Jiménez, Steve Jones, Jonathan Kaye, Jerry Kelly, Skip Kendall, Tom Kite, Greg Kraft, Bernhard Langer, Franklin Langham, Paul Lawrie, Tom Lehman, Justin Leonard, J. L. Lewis, Frank Lickliter, Davis Love III, Steve Lowery, Andrew Magee, Jeff Maggert, John Maginnes, Shigeki Maruyama, Len Mattiace, Billy Mayfair, Scott McCarron, Rocco Mediate, Phil Mickelson, Larry Mize, Colin Montgomerie, Greg Norman, Mark O'Meara, José María Olazábal, Naomichi Ozaki, Jesper Parnevik, Craig Parry, Steve Pate, Dennis Paulson, Corey Pavin, Tom Pernice Jr., Chris Perry, Kenny Perry, Nick Price, Dicky Pride, Tom Purtzer, Charles Raulerson, Mike Reid, Chris Riley, Loren Roberts, Rory Sabbatini, Tom Scherrer, Joey Sindelar, Vijay Singh, Jeff Sluman, Craig Stadler, Paul Stankowski, Steve Stricker, David Sutherland, Kevin Sutherland, Hal Sutton, Esteban Toledo, Tommy Tolles, David Toms, Kirk Triplett, Ted Tryba, Bob Tway, Omar Uresti, Jean van de Velde, Scott Verplank, Duffy Waldorf, Brian Watts, Mike Weir, Kevin Wentworth, Lee Westwood, Mark Wiebe, Tiger Woods, Ian Woosnam

Round summaries

First round
Thursday, March 23, 2000
Friday, March 24, 2000

Source:

Second round
Friday, March 24, 2000

Source:

Third round
Saturday, March 25, 2000

Source:

Final round
Sunday, March 26, 2000Monday, March 27, 2000

Video
You Tube – Sutton on 72nd hole at 2000 Players

References

External links
The Players Championship website
Full Leaderboard

2000
2000 in golf
2000 in American sports
2000 in sports in Florida
March 2000 sports events in the United States